This page contains a list of political parties in India that are aligned with the communist ideology. Most communist parties in India trace their origins to- 
(i) the Communist Party of India, the oldest communist party in India, takes part in parliamentary processes; 
(ii) the All India Forward Bloc which was a faction within the Indian National Congress led by Subhas Chandra Bose, the leader of the Indian National Army, which led an armed struggle for independence during World War II. Today AIFB takes part in parliamentary processes; 
(iii) the Revolutionary Socialist Party (India), which is considered the successor to Anushilan Samiti, and Hindustan Socialist Republican Association, the HSRA was an organization that lead an armed revolutionary socialist movement against the British raj (Prominent members include Bhagat Singh, Chandra Shekhar Azad), the Anushilan Samiti believed in using revolutionary violence to end colonial rule, and was led by Aurobindo Gosh. Today RSP takes part in parliamentary processes; 
(iv) the Communist Party of India (Marxist), which split from the Communist Party of India following the Sino-Soviet split, takes part in parliamentary processes; 
(v) and finally, the now-defunct Communist Party of India (Marxist–Leninist), which was formed after the Naxalbari uprising by radicals from the Communist Party of India (Marxist) and its peasant's wing All India Kisan Sabha. It gave rise to many groups who carry out a revolutionary socialist armed struggle against the Indian on the lines of Mao Zedong's people's war military stratergy and Charu Majumdar's "Historic Eight Documents", some splinter factions gave up armed struggle and joined parliamentary processes. (see Naxalite–Maoist insurgency)

Currently, electoral socialist politics is  especially prevalent in the states of Kerala, West Bengal, and Tripura. 

In terms of armed insurgency the red corridor, also called the red zone, is a region that is considerably affected by the Naxalite–Maoist insurgency, the red corridor is in the eastern, central, and southern parts of India more specifically in Andhra Pradesh, Bihar, Chhattisgarh, Jharkhand, Madhya Pradesh, Maharashtra, Odisha, Telangana, and West Bengal.

Communist Parties Registered with Election Commission of India

Communist Parties with National Party Status

Communist Parties with State Party Status

Regional Communist Parties
Parties that are regional in nature and are registered yet unrecognised.

Minor Communist Parties
Negligible impact on Indian politics, many don't contest elections or organise. Some of these parties used to be important at state or even national level.

Pro Left Front Parties
Parties that support the Left Front in West Bengal and Tripura-

 Azad Hind Mancha led by Ali Imran Ramz

 Communist Marxist Party (Rajeshkumar) led by M. Rajeshkumar
 Revolutionary Socialist Party (Leninist) Kovoor led by Kovoor Kunjumon
 Revolutionary Socialist Party (Leninist) Ambalathara led by Ambalathara Sreedharan Nair

Left United Front Parties
Parties in opposition to Left Front in West Bengal and Tripura as well as Left Democratic Front in Kerala-

Pro UPA Communist Parties
Part of now defunct Confederation of Indian Communists and Democratic Socialists (CICDS)
 United Communist Party of India led by Mohit Sen
 Communist Marxist Party (John) led by C. P. John
 Party of Democratic Socialism led by Saifuddin Choudhury and Samir Putatundu
 Communist Revolutionary League of India (CRLI) led by Ashim Chatterjee
 Peoples Revolutionary Party of India (Paschimbanga Ganatantrik Manch) led by Sumantha Hira
 Tripura Ganatantrik Manch led by Ajoy Biswas
 Janganotantrik Morcha led by Ajoy Biswas
 Marxist Manch of Assam
 Orissa Communist Party led by Ajay Rout
 Krantikari Samyavadi Party based in Bihar
 Rashtravadi Communist Party based in Uttar Pradesh
 Madhya Pradesh Kisan Mazdoor Adivasi Kranti Dal
Others

Pro-BJP/ NDA Communist Parties

Other Communist Parties

Lal Nishan Party (Leninvadi)
New Socialist Alternative
Telangana Communist Party of India
Odisha Communist Party
Bahujana Communist Party
Lok Sangharsh Morcha
Revolutionary Socialist Party of Kerala (Bolshevik)
Revolutionary Socialist Party (Left)
Communist Marxist Party (Aravindakshan)

Pro-armed struggle Communist Parties

Moderate Pro-Naxal/ Maoist Communist Parties

Communist Party of India (Marxist-Leninist) Liberation
Communist Party of India (Marxist–Leninist) Class Struggle led by Kanu Sanyal
Marxist-Leninist Party of India (Red Flag) led by P.C. Unnichekkan
Communist Party of India (Marxist-Leninist) Red Star led by K.N. Ramchandran
Communist Party of India (Marxist-Leninist) New Democracy led by Yatendra Kumar
State Organising Committee, Communist Party of India (Marxist–Leninist) led by Leba Chand Tudu
Communist Party of India (Marxist-Leninist) Somnath led by Somnath Chatterjee Ukhra and Pradip Banerjee
Communist Party of India (Marxist-Leninist) Shantipal
Provisional Central Committee, Communist Party of India (Marxist-Leninist) led by Santosh Rana
Unity Centre of Communist Revolutionaries of India (Marxist-Leninist) (D.V. Rao)
Communist Ghadar Party of India
Communist Party of Bharat led by Ranjan Chakraborty
Marxist-Leninist Committee led by K. Venkateswar Rao
Communist Party of India (Marxist-Leninist) Praja Pantha
Communist Party of India (Marxist-Leninist) Jan Samvad
Communist Party of India (Marxist-Leninist) Nai Pahal
Communist Party of India (Marxist-Leninist) New Proletarian
Communist Party of India (Marxist-Leninist) Maharashtra
Revolutionary Socialist Party of India (Marxist-Leninist)

Extremist Pro-Naxal/ Maoist Communist Parties

Communist Party of India (Maoist) led by Muppala Lakshmana Rao
Revolutionary Communist Centre of India (Marxist-Leninist-Maoist)
Communist Revolutionary Centre
Communist Party of United States of India led by Veeranna
Communist Party of India (Marxist-Leninist) Janashakti - Koora Rajanna led by Koora Rajanna
Communist Party of India (Marxist-Leninist) Janashakti - Ranadheer led by Ranadheer
Communist Party of India (Marxist-Leninist) Janashakti - Chandra Pulla Reddy led by Chandra Pulla Reddy
Communist Party of India (Marxist-Leninist) (Mahadev Mukherjee) led by Mahadev Mukherjee
Communist Party of India (Marxist-Leninist) Bhaijee
Communist Party of India (Marxist-Leninist) Prajashakti
Communist Party of India (Marxist-Leninist) Prathighatana
Communist Party of India (Marxist-Leninist) Praja Pratighatana
Communist Party of India (Marxist–Leninist) Second Central Committee
Communist Party of India (Marxist-Leninist) Central Team
Communist Party Reorganisation Centre of India (Marxist-Leninist)
Communist League of India (Marxist-Leninist) Ramnath
Communist League of India (Marxist-Leninist) Parikalpana
Communist League of India (Marxist-Leninist) Revisionist 
Re-organizing Committee, Communist League of India (Marxist-Leninist)

Defunct Communist Parties

 Marxist Communist Party of India
 Marxist League (India)
 Marxist League of Kerala
 National Democratic Front of Boroland
 National Revolutionary Socialist Party
 Communist Party of India (Marxist–Leninist) Naxalbari
 Organising Committee, Communist Party of India (Marxist–Leninist)
 Pakistan Communist Party
 Communist Party of India (Marxist–Leninist) People's War
 Punjab Communist Revolutionary Committee
 Real Communist Party of India
 Communist Party of India (Marxist–Leninist) Red Flag
 Revolutionary Communist Centre of India (Maoist)
 Revolutionary Communist Centre of India (Marxist–Leninist)
 Revolutionary Communist Council of India
 Revolutionary Communist Party (India)
 Revolutionary Communist Party of India (Das)
 Revolutionary Communist Party of India (Tagore)
 Revolutionary Communist Unity Centre (Marxist–Leninist) 
 Revolutionary Marxist Party
 Revolutionary Socialist Party (Leninist)
 Revolutionary Socialist Party (Sreekandan Nair)
 Revolutionary Socialist Party of India (Marxist)
 Revolutionary Workers Party (India)
 Samyavadi Sangstha
 Socialist Party (Marxist)
 Socialist Workers Party (India)
 Tamil Nadu Communist Party
 Unity Centre of Communist Revolutionaries of India (Marxist–Leninist)
 Unity Centre of Communist Revolutionaries of India (Marxist–Leninist) (Ajmer group)
 Unity Centre of Communist Revolutionaries of India (Marxist–Leninist) (Anand)
 Unity Centre of Communist Revolutionaries of India (Marxist–Leninist) (Harbhajan Sohi)
 Unity Centre of Communist Revolutionaries of India (Marxist–Leninist) Subodh Mitra
 Uttar Pradesh Revolutionary Socialist Party
 Workers and Peasants Party (India)
 Workers Revolutionary Party (India)
 Organising Committee, Communist Party of India (Marxist–Leninist)

Defunct Naxal-Maoist Communist Parties

Separatist Communist Parties

Active Communist Parties

Manipur

Greater Nepal

Defunct Communist Parties

Bodoland

See also

Socialism in India
Communism in India
Communism in Kerala
Naxalite
List of political parties in India
Politics of India
List of Naxalite and Maoist groups in India

References

 
Lists of political parties in India
Communist parties by country
Lists of political parties
Communist parties
Far-left politics
Socialism-related lists
Socialism
Communism